Nong Wua Thao railway station is a railway station located in Phra Bat Subdistrict, Lampang City, Lampang. It is located 637.414 km from Bangkok railway station and is a class 3 railway station.

Train services
 Local 407/408 Nakhon Sawan-Chiang Mai-Nakhon Sawan

References 
 Ichirō, Kakizaki (2010). Ōkoku no tetsuro: tai tetsudō no rekishi. Kyōto: Kyōtodaigakugakujutsushuppankai. 
 Otohiro, Watanabe (2013). Tai kokutetsu yonsenkiro no tabi: shasō fūkei kanzen kiroku. Tōkyō: Bungeisha. 

Railway stations in Thailand